Lampronia fuscatella is a moth of the family Prodoxidae. It is found in most of Europe, with the exception of Iceland, Ireland, Portugal, Italy and most of the Balkan Peninsula. To the east its range extends to the Baltic region and northern Russia.

The wingspan is 14–18 mm. Head whitish-yellowish. Forewings rather dark shining prismatic fuscous. Hindwings with hair-scales, grey. Adults are on wing from May to June and are active in the afternoon sunshine.

The larvae form a swelling, or gall on a twig of a Betula species, usually at a node, within which it feeds.

References

External links
 Fauna Europaea
 UKmoths

Prodoxidae
Moths of Europe
Moths of Asia
Moths described in 1848